Khairul Hafiz bin Jantan (born 22 July 1998) is a Malaysian sprinter, competing in events ranging from 100 metres to 400 metres. He was the former Malaysian 100 metres outdoor record holder with a time of 10.18 seconds.
Khaiful Hafiz, representing Melaka, had broken the record set by Watson Nyambek (10.38 set in 1998) during the Malaysia Games in Kuching in 2016. His personal best of 20.90 seconds in the 200 metres was the Malaysian national junior record.

References

External links
 Khairul Hafiz Jantan profile at IAAF 
 Khairul Hafiz Jantan profile at all-athletics.com
 Khairul Hafiz Jantan - Tag Archive - Sports247.My

1998 births
Living people
People from Malacca
Malaysian male sprinters
Malaysian people of Malay descent
Athletes (track and field) at the 2018 Commonwealth Games
Athletes (track and field) at the 2018 Asian Games
Southeast Asian Games medalists in athletics
Southeast Asian Games gold medalists for Malaysia
Southeast Asian Games silver medalists for Malaysia
Competitors at the 2017 Southeast Asian Games
Competitors at the 2019 Southeast Asian Games
Asian Games competitors for Malaysia
Commonwealth Games competitors for Malaysia
21st-century Malaysian people